The 2008 Arkansas Republican presidential primary took place on February 5, 2008, with 31 national delegates.

Former Governor of Arkansas Mike Huckabee was the winner of this Primary.

Results

* Includes 31 delegates from February 5 primary results, plus 3 unpledged RNC member delegates

See also
 2008 Republican Party presidential primaries
 2008 Arkansas Democratic presidential primary

References

Arkansas
Republican presidential primary
2008 Super Tuesday
Arkansas Republican primaries